Greenberry or Green Berry may refer to:

 Greenberry, Oregon, an unincorporated community in Benton County, Oregon, United States

People
 Nicholas Greenberry (1640-1697), Royal Governor of the U.S. state Maryland
 Green Berry Raum (1829–1909), American politician from Illinois
 Greenberry G. Rupert (1847–1922), American Adventist pastor
 William Greeneberry Russell (1818–1877), American prospector
 Green Berry Samuels (1806–1859), American politician from Virginia
 Green Berry Smith (1820–1886), American politician, member of the 1849 Oregon Territorial Legislature